Darwinia biflora  is a plant in the myrtle family Myrtaceae and is endemic to New South Wales. It is an erect, often straggly shrub with flattened, glabrous leaves, and flowers which are arranged in pairs. The flowers are greenish in colour but each is surrounded by two purple-red bracteoles and have a long yellow-green style projecting out of the flower tube. The species only occurs in the Sydney region in a few places where shale-capped ridges intergrade with Hawkesbury sandstone.

Description
The leaves are glabrous and arranged in a decussate pattern along the branches.

When they open, the flowers are tubular in shape, white to pink in the upper parts and green in the floral tube.

Taxonomy
The first formal description was by Edwin Cheel who gave the plant the name Darwinia taxifolia var. biflora.  The description was published in 1922 in Journal and Proceedings of the Royal Society of New South Wales. In 1962, Barbara Briggs raised it to species status and published the change in Contributions from the New South Wales National Herbarium.

The specific epithet (biflora) is derived from the Latin prefix bi- meaning "two" and the Latin word flos meaning "flower".

Distribution and habitat
Although there are herbarium specimens of this species from further afield, all the present populations occur in the urban areas of Sydney between Maroota and North Ryde. It grows in heath on sandstone ridge tops or in woodland where the sandstone intergrades with shale. Ninety of the 240 known sites where the species occurs are in national parks or other reserves but the remainder are in habitats often favoured for residential development.

Ecology
Individual plants of Darwinia biflora are thought to live for 15 to 20 years. The plants usually self-pollinate and insects have rarely been observed visiting the flowers. Seed is usually not produced until the plants are about 5 years old but the viability of seed is high and although fire kills the plant, many new seedlings appear after fire.

Conservation
Darwinia biflora is listed as a vulnerable species in New South Wales and in terms of the Australian Government Environment Protection and Biodiversity Conservation Act 1999.

References

Flora of New South Wales
Myrtales of Australia
biflora
Plants described in 1922
Taxa named by Edwin Cheel